The 2022 Constellation Cup was the 12th Constellation Cup series between Australia and New Zealand. The series was held in October 2022 across four netball test matches, with two matches each held in New Zealand and Australia. New Zealand were the defending holders of the cup, having defeated Australia by three games to one in 2021.

New Zealand won the first two tests and led 2–0 going into the third test. However, Australia won the third and fourth tests to level the series at 2–2. Australia were declared the winners to regain the Constellation Cup for the tenth time because, having scored 215 goals compared to New Zealand's 208, they had a better aggregate score over the series.

Squads

Australia

Notes
  Gretel Bueta withdrew from the squad on 4 October 2022 after announcing her pregnancy.
  Sophie Garbin was added to the squad on 10 October 2022 to replace Gretel Bueta.
  Amy Parmenter made her international debut in the first match of this series.
  Maddy Proud, Sophie Dwyer and Ruby Bakewell-Doran all made their international debuts in the second match of this series.
  Joanna Weston was added to the squad on 18 October 2022 due to injury to Sunday Aryang.

New Zealand

 

Notes
  Sulu Tone-Fitzpatrick, Mila Reuelu-Buchanan, and Peta Toeava were only selected for the first two matches played in New Zealand.
  Maddy Gordon, Kimiora Poi, and Elle Temu were only selected for the final two matches played in Australia.

Match officials

Umpires

Umpire Appointments Panel

Matches

First test

Second test

Third test

Fourth test

References

2022
2022 in New Zealand netball
2022 in Australian netball
October 2022 sports events in Australia
October 2022 sports events in New Zealand